Ormoy is the name of four communes in France:
 Ormoy, Eure-et-Loir
 Ormoy, Haute-Saône
 Ormoy, Yonne
 Ormoy, Essonne